Gue is a village in the Lahul & Spiti district of the state of Himachal Pradesh in India. In this little village lays the perfectly well-preserved 593-year-old mummy of Sangha Tenzing. It was a Buddhist monk from Tibet. It was found in a sitting position, with his skin and hair intact. The village is about 40 km from the Tabo Monastery. The latitude 31.11 and longitude 77.16 are the geocoordinate of the Gue. Current Gue is controlled by India but claimed by Zanda County, Ngari Prefecture, Tibet, China.

Mummy

The village is located just kilometers away from the India-China border where a 550-year-old mummified monk, Sangha Tenzin is being guarded. A few years ago, there were reports that it had been stolen from the shrine and found its way across the border. Though, due to the activeness of local authorities returned the mummy to the shrine. It is believed that natives claim to know of its existence since the mid-Seventies, inside a tomb at a different location. A number of people apparently saw the mummy for the first time after an earthquake disfigured the tomb. But it was only during the excavation by the ITBP that the mummy was "officially" found and moved to its current location.

Demographic
Hindi is the local language of Gue is and most of the village people speak this for interaction. The distance of Shimla is 430 km and 250 km from Manali. The village has sets the icy-breeze right temperature across the year. The village is surrounded with a range of mountains that offers clean and cold air. It is a beautiful village with whitewashed houses located near off the highway; it is so remote that there are wildflowers growing on the road. There has been a big temple constructed in Japanese style for keeping the mummy.

Geographical
The village is located 10,000 feet above sea level in Lahaul and Spiti district. It is 500 km away from the state capital, is located between the towns Sumdo and Tabo. The village was also in the news when a snow leopard reportedly killed more than 40 goats and sheep in the remote village which was later wards by officials of the forest department’s wildlife wing.

Nearest villages
Following are the nearest villages here-
 Tabo (Spiti)
 Nidang (Spiti)
 Dhankar
 Samling (Spiti)
 Sagnam (Spiti) at Pin Valley 
 Kaza (Spiti)
 Rangrik (Spiti)
 Kibber
 Losar (Spiti)
 Shalkhar (Kinnaur)
 Chango Uperla (Kinnaur)
 Nako
 Korzok

References

Villages in Lahaul and Spiti district